Mosvodokanal is the largest water company in Russia, providing services in water supply and sanitation for more than 15 million people, mainly in Moscow.

The main activities of the Mosvodokanal are:
 water intake, cleaning and distribution of water in the network;
 collection, transportation and cleaning of urban wastewater;
 operation of water supply and sewage systems of urban and other settlements;
 reception and disposal of snow mass.

References 

Companies established in 1779
Water companies of Russia
Companies based in Moscow
1779 establishments in the Russian Empire